van't Hoff is a lunar impact crater named after Dutch chemist Jacobus H. van 't Hoff and is located to the northeast of the walled plain Birkhoff, on the far side of the Moon. To the northwest is the crater Stebbins, and to the east lies the smaller Dyson.

This crater lies at high northern latitudes of the lunar surface, almost two-thirds the way from the equator to the pole. The outer rim of van't Hoff is heavily eroded and the crater has become distorted in shape by subsequent impacts. The rim edge is ill-defined in the western half where the inner wall is unusually wide. This edge may have become overlain by ejecta from other impacts to the west.

Along the eastern face the crater has apparently merged with one or two other impacts, producing an outward double-bulge. There are several smaller impacts along the eastern rim, and a gouge in the surface forms a trough leading away to the northeast for nearly a crater diameter. Much of the interior floor of van't Hoff is relatively level, and is marked by some small craterlets. The most prominent of these is a small, cup-shaped crater in the southern half.

Satellite craters
By convention these features are identified on lunar maps by placing the letter on the side of the crater midpoint that is closest to van't Hoff.

References

 
 
 
 
 
 
 
 
 
 
 
 

Impact craters on the Moon
Jacobus Henricus van 't Hoff